Covington is an independent city in the Commonwealth of Virginia. As of the 2020 census, the population was 5,737, making it the second-least populous city in Virginia. It is surrounded by Alleghany County, of which it is also the county seat. Located at the confluence of Jackson River and Dunlap Creek, Covington is one of three cities (with Roanoke and Salem) in the Roanoke Regional Partnership.  The Bureau of Economic Analysis combines the city of Covington with Alleghany county for statistical purposes.

History
Covington is named in honor of General Leonard Covington, hero of the War of 1812 and friend of James Madison and Thomas Jefferson.

As a result of the industrial boom, the population of Covington grew from 704 in 1890 to 5,632 in 1920. Clifton Forge, originally known as Williamson, became a voting place in 1839. In 1837, the railroad came, making Clifton Forge the major division point on the railroad. Clifton Forge, named after one of the iron furnaces, became an incorporated City in 1884. Cutbacks and the closing of the C&O railroad shops in the late 1980's caused a drop in population for Clifton Forge. In July 2001, Clifton Forge reverted from a city to a town due to financial hardship.

Falling Spring, a 200 ft cascading waterfall into a gorge was referred to by Thomas Jefferson, for its scenic beauty in his Notes on Virginia, A plaque nearby refers to Indian War figure, Mad Ann Bailey, a frontier woman adept at shooting, riding & swearing.

Geography
The city lies along both sides of the Jackson River.

Climate
The climate in this area is characterized by hot, humid summers and generally mild to cool winters.  According to the Köppen Climate Classification system, Covington has a humid subtropical climate, abbreviated "Cfa" on climate maps.

Demographics

2020 census

Note: the US Census treats Hispanic/Latino as an ethnic category. This table excludes Latinos from the racial categories and assigns them to a separate category. Hispanics/Latinos can be of any race.

2000 Census
The population of Covington has gradually declined since reaching its peak of 11,062 in 1960. The population decline has mainly resulted from losses of manufacturing jobs in the area. One major loss of manufacturing jobs occurred after a fire at the Hercules plant in June 1980, causing $23 million in damage and worker layoffs.

As of the census of 2000, there were 6,303 people, 2,835 households, and 1,740 families residing in the city.  The population density was 1,111.3 people per square mile (429.2/km2). The racial makeup of the city was 84.1% White, 13.1% Black or African American, 0.4% Native American, 0.7% Asian, 0.0% Pacific Islander, 0.2% from other races, and 1.6% from two or more races.  0.6% of the population were Hispanic or Latino of any race.

There were 3,195 housing units at an average density of 563.3 per square mile (217.6/km2).  There were 2,835 households, out of which 23.7% had children under the age of 18 living with them, 44.9% were married couples living together, 12.5% had a female householder with no husband present, and 38.6% were non-families. Of all households 34.0% were made up of individuals, and 16.4% had someone living alone who was 65 years of age or older.  The average household size was 2.22 and the average family size was 2.83.

In the city, the population was spread out, with 21.5% under the age of 18, 8.2% from 18 to 24, 26.3% from 25 to 44, 23.9% from 45 to 64, and 20.2% who were 65 years of age or older.  The median age was 40 years. For every 100 females, there were 91.6 males.  For every 100 females age 18 and over, there were 86.1 males.

The median income for a household in the city was $30,325, and the median income for a family was $36,640. Males had a median income of $30,755 versus $20,316 for females. The per capita income for the city was $16,758.  About 10.7% of families and 12.9% of the population were below the poverty line, including 16.1% of those under age 18 and 9.1% of those age 65 or over.

Economy 
Covington's economy is dominated by Westrock, which has been operating in the city since 1899. The facility employs about 1300 workers, mostly from Covington and Alleghany County. Its production includes bleached paper and paperboard for packaging, and is the second largest on the East Coast.

Both Alleghany County, VA and Covington City are known for the low cost of their housing markets and close proximity to The Homestead in Bath County (VA), Lexington (VA), The Greenbrier in White Sulphur Springs (WV), Lewisburg (WV), and Roanoke (VA), each of which is within about a 45-minute drive.

Sports 
Covington has a team in the Valley Baseball League called the Lumberjacks.

Government
The city has a council–manager government. The current mayor of Covington is Thomas H. Sibold Jr.

Politics

Education 
Covington has one 8–12 high school (Covington High School), one 4–7 middle school called (Jeter-Watson), one pre-kindergarten through third grade elementary school (Edgemont Primary), one State Governors School (Jackson River Governor's School), one technical center for high-school students (Jackson River Technical Center), and one community college  (Dabney S. Lancaster).

In late 2020, it was announced that Alleghany County Public Schools and Covington City Public Schools would merge due to declining attendance. The new school system will be known as Alleghany Highlands Public Schools and the two high schools will merge to create a new Alleghany High School that will take on Covington's Cougar nickname beginning in 2023. Covington High School will be converted into a new middle school.

Media
The local newspapers of record are The Virginian Review and The Recorder. Covington is served by two radio stations. WKEY simulcasts on 103.5 FM and 1340 AM, and WJVR broadcasts on 101.9 FM with simulcast on 1230 AM in nearby Clifton Forge.

Infrastructure

Transportation 
The area is serviced by Interstate 64 (east-west) and Route 220 (north-south) offering rail, truck and interstate access to the area. Rail passenger service is provided at the Amtrak station in Clifton Forge, VA 12 miles away.

Fire protection
Fire protection is provided by the Covington Fire Department, which was chartered on March 4, 1902. The Covington Rescue Squad provides emergency medical services to the city of Covington. Both the fire department and rescue squad are volunteer organizations. The rescue squad was organized in 1933 and is the third oldest volunteer rescue squad in Virginia.

Gallery

Notable people
 Bimbo Coles, born in Covington. In the National Basketball Association, he played for the Miami Heat, Golden State Warriors, Atlanta Hawks, Cleveland Cavaliers, and Boston Celtics.
 Addie Elizabeth Davis, first woman ordained as a Southern Baptist pastor.
 Bob Humphreys, baseball pitcher
 Jim Lemon, born in Covington, who was an American right and left fielder, manager and coach in Major League Baseball.
 Edgar P. Rucker, lawyer and politician
 William R. Terrill, a United States Army soldier and general who was killed in action at the Battle of Perryville during the American Civil War.

See also
 National Register of Historic Places listings in Covington, Virginia

References

External links
 City of Covington

 
Cities in Virginia
County seats in Virginia
Western Virginia